is a Japanese lyricist and former musician. After several years playing the drums in the rock bands Apryl Fool and Happy End during the late 1960s and early 1970s, Matsumoto decided to focus on writing lyrics for others in 1974. As of 2015, he had written over 2,100 songs, 130 of which entered the top 10 on the Oricon chart. Total sales of the singles he has written exceed 49.8 million copies, making him the third best-selling lyricist in Japan. In 2017, he was awarded the Medal with Purple Ribbon from the Japanese government for his work in music.

Life and career
In elementary school, Matsumoto listened to Igor Stravinsky and read poetry by Jean Cocteau. However, he bought a drum kit and became obsessed with rock music because of the Beatles. Matsumoto is a Keio University graduate.

In 1968 he joined the psychedelic rock band Apryl Fool, going by the alias Rei Matsumoto, after being invited to join by Haruomi Hosono. However, they announced their break up on the release day of their only album. In 1969, he and Hosono then formed the pioneering rock band Happy End, for which he wrote most of the lyrics. After releasing two studio albums, Happy End (1970) and Kazemachi Roman (1971), they officially disbanded on New Year's Eve 1972, before the 1973 release of their third album.

Upon declaring himself a lyricist, Matsumoto told a friend that he wanted to write a "commercial" song, meaning a TV advertisement. But the friend mistakenly thought by "commercial" he meant "popular" and got him a job writing for Agnes Chan, a pop idol. Matsumoto made his debut as a lyricist in 1974 with "Pocket Ippai no Himitsu" by Chan. Matsumoto said that while in Happy End he focused on the quality of the music over its potential popularity, but upon becoming a lyricist, he vowed to focus on both quality and sales.

He was most prolific in the late 1970s and 1980s, offering lyrics to many idol singers such Seiko Matsuda (including 17 of her 24 consecutive  1 singles), Kyōko Koizumi, Miho Nakayama, Masahiko Kondo and Hiroko Yakushimaru as well as musical artists such as Yellow Magic Orchestra. The songs "Garasu no Shounen", "Hakka Candy" and "Boku no Senaka ni wa Hane ga Aru" by KinKi Kids are some of his notable recent work.

Matsumoto took part in two winning works at 1981's 23rd Japan Record Awards. Akira Terao's hit song "Ruby no Yubiwa" won the Grand Prix award. Matsumoto wrote nine of the ten songs on his Happy End bandmate Eiichi Ohtaki's record A Long Vacation, which won Best Album. Matsuda's album Supreme, which Matsumoto produced, won Best Album at 1986's 28th Japan Record Awards.

In 2002, he formed the independent record label .

In 2015, the tribute album  was created to commemorate Matsumoto's 45th anniversary as a lyricist. The album won a Planning Award at the 57th Japan Record Awards. A special two-day concert for the same anniversary was held at the Tokyo International Forum on August 21–22, 2015 featuring numerous artists such as Hiromi Ōta, Shinji Harada, Shoko Nakagawa, Yū Hayami, Junichi Inagaki, Akiko Yano. Matsumoto himself stepped behind the drum kit once again to perform songs with the surviving members of Happy End; Hosono and Shigeru Suzuki.

Another tribute album, titled  and overseen by Seiji Kameda, was released on July 14, 2021. It features artists such as B'z, Glim Spanky, Daichi Miura, Daoko, and members of Little Glee Monster. At the 63rd Japan Record Awards in 2021, Matsumoto received a Special Award.

Honors
Japan Lyricist Awards, for "Fuyu no Riviera" by Shinichi Mori (1983)
Medal with Purple Ribbon (2017)

References

External links 
 
Official Twitter

Japanese lyricists
Japanese rock drummers
Musicians from Tokyo
Keio University alumni
Recipients of the Medal with Purple Ribbon
1949 births
Living people
Happy End (band) members